Deborah Saint-Phard (born 28 December 1964) is a Haitian athlete. She competed in the women's shot put at the 1988 Summer Olympics.

References

1964 births
Living people
Athletes (track and field) at the 1987 Pan American Games
Pan American Games competitors for Haiti
Athletes (track and field) at the 1988 Summer Olympics
Haitian female shot putters
Olympic athletes of Haiti
World Athletics Championships athletes for Haiti
Place of birth missing (living people)